General elections were held in Solomon Islands on 3 April 2019. They were the first general elections since the RAMSI mission concluded in 2017. On 24 April 2019, Manasseh Sogavare was elected by the 11th National Parliament as Prime Minister of Solomon Islands.

Electoral system
The 50 members of the National Parliament were elected in single-member constituencies using first-past-the-post voting.

Voters had to be at least 18 years old and hold Solomon Islands citizenship. Overseas residents could not vote, and people were disqualified for voting if they have committed a breach of the electoral law, been declared insane, been imprisoned for more than six months, or are under a death sentence. A total of 359,522 Solomon Islanders registered to vote in the elections, an increase of 72,000 compared to the 2014 elections.

Candidates had to be at least 21 years old and resident in the constituency in which they ran. Disqualifications included holding dual citizenship, being executives or members of the Electoral Commission, having an undischarged bankruptcy, being imprisoned for more than six months, or being under a death sentence.

Conduct
There were reports that voters faced irregularities at polling stations, such as names missing from the electoral register.

Fears of violence following the results resulted in police officers being on alert as results were announced.

Australian and New Zealand defence forces provided contingency logistics support before and during the elections, including approximately 300 personnel, HMAS Melville, and six support helicopters. Observers included New Zealand observer groups in three constituencies, Australian observer groups in fourteen constituencies, and Australian National University researchers and observers in fifteen constituencies.

Results

By constituency

References

Solomon
Elections in the Solomon Islands
2019 in the Solomon Islands